Caltoris is a genus of skipper butterflies. Like several related genera, they are called "swifts".It is found in the Indomalayan realm and the Australasian realm.

Species
 Caltoris aurociliata (Elwes & Edwards, 1897) Sikkim, Assam
 Caltoris beraka (Plötz, 1885) Celebes
 Caltoris boisduvalii (C. Felder & R. Felder, [1867]) Papua
 Caltoris bromus (Leech, 1894) India, China, Indo-China, Malay Peninsula, Sumatra, Java, Lesser Sunda Is., Borneo, Palawan, Philippines
 Caltoris brunnea (Snellen, 1876) Java, Myanmar
 Caltoris cahira, colon swift,
 Caltoris cahira austeni, Austen's swift
 Caltoris canaraica, Kanara swift
 Caltoris confusa
 Caltoris cormasa (Hewitson, 1876) India to Malaya
 Caltoris kumara, blank swift
 Caltoris malaya (Evans, 1926) Malay Peninsula, Borneo, Java
 Caltoris mehavagga (Fruhstorfer, 1911) Celebes, Sula, Buru
 Caltoris nirwana (Plötz, 1882) Java to West China
 Caltoris philippina, Philippine swift
 Caltoris plebeia (de Nicéville, 1887) tufted swift. Sikkim to Borneo
 Caltoris septentrionalis Koiwaiya, 1996
 Caltoris sirius (Evans, 1926) Tibet
 Caltoris tenuis (Evans, 1932) Myanmar, Thailand, Laos
 Caltoris tulsi (de Nicéville, [1884]) purple swift. India to Malaya, South China, Java

The larvae variously feed on Poaceae, Arecaceae:-Bambusa, Imperata, Dendrocalamus, Sinarundinaria, Oryza, Saccharum.

References

 
Hesperiidae genera